Héctor José Regalado (January 29, 1943 – November 4, 2010) was a Venezuelan Latin music bandleader, percussionist, composer and educator. He played professionally under the name Rudy Regalado.

Profile
Although he toured extensively in a career spanning more than 50 years, Rudy Regalado is better known for being one of the key members of El Chicano's percussion section, a popular Los Angeles-based group that surfaced during the Santana and Malo Latin-tinged rock era in the early 1970s. Besides this, Regalado led his own groups including the stage band Chévere and performed on countless recording sessions with distinguished artists. In addition to recording five albums with El Chicano, he also collaborated in projects led by Alex Acuña, Quincy Jones, Alphonse Mouzon, Bill Summers and Joe Zawinul, among others.

Early life
Regalado was born and raised in a working-class family in Caracas, the capital city of Venezuela. Largely self-taught, he started to play drums and timbales as a teenager in his home town. A devoted baseball fan, he adopted his nickname after former Cleveland Indians infielder Rudy Regalado.

Professional career
In 1963, Regalado moved to Puerto Rico and started playing in hotels and clubs in the San Juan area, while studying harmony and percussion at Pablo Casals Conservatory of Music. He settled in Los Angeles, California in 1970, where he played with local jazz and Latin groups before joining El Chicano late in the year.

Regalado spent twelve years with El Chicano, singing and playing the timbales in five albums, which included Top 40 hits during the 1970s with the songs "Viva Tirado" and "Tell Her She's Lovely". El Chicano also created the theme song for the television series Baretta, which ran on ABC from 1975 to 1978.
 
After spending 12 years with El Chicano, Regalado formed his own Latin Jazz All-Star Band in 1983, which included a select group of musicians from Los Angeles. Initially known as Todos Estrellas, the band eventually became known as Chévere and appeared at the Playboy Jazz Festival, Disneyland and Fiesta Broadway, among other engagements. The band also performed overseas in summer festivals in Canada, Hong Kong, Indonesia, Kuala Lumpur, Malaysia, Singapore, Thailand, and throughout the European continent.

As part of an El Chicano reunion in 2009, Regalado performed during the 40th anniversary of Woodstock Festival at the Golden Gate Park Music Concourse in San Francisco, where the group actually celebrated their own 40th Anniversary, and last played with them at the Greek Theatre of Los Angeles.

Other credits
Regalado also toured with Aretha Franklin in charge of her percussion section, was a drummer for Los Melódicos on its 1980 tour of United States, and performed on The Tonight Show, the Nancy Wilson Show and American Bandstand.

His film credits include The Skeleton Key (2005), as well in the television series Pepe Plata (1990) and Clubhouse (2004).

Regalado moved later to Las Vegas, Nevada, where he died from complications of pneumonia at the age of 67.

Selected discography

Selected videos at YouTube.com

References

1943 births
2010 deaths
Afro-Cuban jazz percussionists
Blues rock musicians
Deaths from pneumonia in Nevada
Musicians from Los Angeles
People from Caracas
Timbaleros
Venezuelan bandleaders
Venezuelan musicians